The Lone Star Conference (LSC) is a college athletic conference affiliated with the National Collegiate Athletic Association (NCAA) at the Division II level. Member institutions are located in the southwestern United States, with schools in Texas, Oklahoma, New Mexico, and Arkansas. Three schools in the Pacific Northwest—one each in Oregon, Washington, and the Canadian province of British Columbia—became football-only members in 2022.

The Lone Star Conference operates from the same headquarters complex in the Dallas suburb of Richardson as the American Southwest Conference.

History
The conference was formed in 1931 when five schools withdrew from the old Texas Intercollegiate Athletic Association. Charter members included East Texas State (now Texas A&M–Commerce), North Texas State (now University of North Texas), Sam Houston State, Southwest Texas State (now Texas State), and Stephen F. Austin. With Texas A&M–Commerce starting its transition to Division I in July 2022, none of the five charter members remain in Division II or in the conference – all have moved up to Division I (in football as of 2022, North Texas, Sam Houston, and Texas State compete in the NCAA Division I FBS, while Stephen F. Austin and Texas A&M–Commerce compete in the NCAA Division I FCS).

Chronological timeline

Below is a timeline of the conference's history.

 1931 - The conference was formed on April 25, 1931, at a meeting in Denton, Texas, when five schools withdrew from the old Texas Intercollegiate Athletic Association. Charter members included East Texas State University (now Texas A&M University–Commerce), North Texas State University (now University of North Texas), Sam Houston State College (now Sam Houston State University), Southwestern State College (later Southwest Texas State University, then Texas State University–San Marcos, now Texas State University), and Stephen F. Austin State College (now Stephen F. Austin State University). The conference constitution required member schools to sponsor football, basketball, track & field and tennis. The 1931-32 basketball season was the first sport to be competed within the conference. At the first annual conference business meeting on December 12, 1931, Trinity University was admitted to the LSC, effective for the 1932-33 academic year.
 1933 - Trinity University announced that the school was withdrawing from the LSC to return to the Texas Conference, but would still compete in the LSC until the 1933-34 academic year.
 1934 - At the annual LSC business meeting in December, conference presidents considered Texas A&I University, Sul Ross State University and West Texas State Teachers College (then West Texas State University) for admittance, but full membership was not granted at that time.
 1938 - The Lone Star Conference joined the National Collegiate Athletic Association (NCAA).
 1940 - The LSC Faculty Athletics Representatives voted, upon recommendation of the LSC Directors of Athletics, to add golf as a conference sport with the first championship scheduled for May 17, 1941 (of the 1940-41 academic year).
 1941 - At the annual meeting on December 13, 1941, six days after the beginning of World War II, LSC members went on record as favoring "continuing a full sports program as long as it does not interfere with the nation's all-out war effort".
 1942 - At the December 12, 1942, conference meeting, the LSC faculty athletics representatives approved football and basketball as conference sports during the war as long as transportation was available. All spring sports, excluding track, were discontinued.
 1945 - On November 9, 1945, and with the end of World War II, a called meeting of conference directors of athletics and faculty athletics representatives was held in Waco, Texas. Basketball, tennis, track, golf, and football were planned as conference sports for the 1946-47 academic year. An invitation for conference membership was extended to the University of Houston and Southwestern University of Georgetown, Texas. Houston expressed a desire to schedule tentative basketball and football schedules, pending action to its board of regents. In addition, Trinity University and Howard Payne University were also discussed as possible new members.
 1945 - On December 8, 1945, the University of Houston was officially admitted to the LSC.
 1946 - On April 23, 1946, at a conference spring meeting, Trinity University was admitted to the LSC, effective in the 1946-47 academic year; therefore, rejoining the conference after a 12-year hiatus.
 1946 - On December 7, 1946, at a conference winter meeting, a vote was taken to add baseball to the list of LSC sports, effective in the 1947 spring season.
 1947 - On May 16, 1947, Texas A&I University applied for admission to the LSC, but was never admitted due to some geographic concerns.
 1948 - On December 10–11, 1948, at a winter meeting, Hardin College (now Midwestern State University) was admitted to the LSC by unanimous vote.
 1949 - North Texas State University, the University of Houston, Trinity University, and Hardin College withdrew from the LSC, effective June 1, 1949, to form the Gulf Coast Conference.
 1950 - Sul Ross State University and Lamar State College of Technology (now Lamar University) were admitted to the LSC.
 1953 - On December 12, 1953, Texas A&I was admitted to the LSC and began competition in the 1954 fall season of the 1954-55 academic year.
 1956 - McMurry College applied for LSC membership, but was voted down.
 1956 - Howard Payne was admitted to the LSC, effective the 1956-57 academic year.
 1958 - Conference members approved a motion that the LSC must follow NCAA rules for football instead of NAIA rules.
 1959 - On May 12, 1959, the LSC Faculty Athletics Representatives rejected a motion that the LSC should be expanded to a nine-school league with the votes 6-2.
 1960 - The conference members voted to accept an invitation by the new Great Southwest Bowl committee to have the LSC football champion as the host team each year for the game in Grand Prairie, Texas, in late December. Texas A&I defeated Arkansas Tech University 45-10 in the first such game on December 31, 1960. Bowl Chairman Cecil Owens said, "We hope the game will be a fine supplement to the Cotton Bowl".
 1962 - On December 7, 1962, at the annual conference meeting in Dallas, the LSC Faculty Athletics Representatives rejected a motion to allow LSC members optional membership in the NAIA or the NCAA, and rejected a motion that the decision of acceptance or refusal of postseason, playoff, or championship events resided within the individual schools. A motion that LSC did not pledge its champions to the NAIA playoffs was also defeated.
 1963 - On May 11, 1963, at the annual conference meeting in Brownwood, Texas, Lamar State College of Technology withdrew from the LSC, effective September 1, 1965.
 1964 - On May 9, 1964, McMurry College was admitted to the LSC with first participation scheduled for spring sports in the 1965 spring season of the 1964-65 academic year, followed by basketball (achieving full member status) in the 1965-66 academic year, and eventually football in the 1966 fall season of the 1966-67 academic year.
 1964 - Also in 1964, San Angelo College (now Angelo State University) attempted to apply to the LSC, but was told that LSC membership is limited to schools which had recognized four-year collegiate standing. San Angelo College's president Dr. B.M. Cavness told the LSC faculty athletics representatives that his school would assume such status in September 1965. He was advised to reapply in December 1965.
 1965 - At the annual fall meeting in Dallas, the LSC faculty athletics representatives voted in a secret ballot not to expand membership in the LSC.
 1968 - After achieving the status requirements since the first attempt, Angelo State University was finally admitted to the LSC. Tarleton State University was also admitted to the LSC.
 1972 - McMurry College left the LSC.
 1973 - Abilene Christian University was admitted to the LSC.
 1975 - Tarleton State University withdrew from the LSC.
 1976 - Sul Ross State University withdrew from the LSC.
 1982 - The Lone Star Conference became an NCAA Division II athletic conference.
 1983 - Southwest Texas State University, Sam Houston State University, and Stephen F. Austin University left the LSC.
 1984 - The LSC Council of Presidents extended an invitation for LSC membership to West Texas State University, and the WTSU Board of Regents accepted the invitation to begin LSC competition in the 1986-87 academic year. Eastern New Mexico University was automatically admitted to the LSC.
 1986 - The LSC Council of Presidents unanimously approved the membership of Central State University (now the University of Central Oklahoma) to establish the concept of a regional conference. Eventually, the school officially became a member of the LSC on July 1, 1987, effective beginning competition within the conference in the 1987-88 academic year.
 1987 - Howard Payne withdrew from the LSC, effective after the 1986-87 academic year.
 1988 - The LSC Council of Presidents approved the admittance of Texas Woman's University to the LSC; effective in the 1989-90 academic year. Cameron University was automatically admitted to the LSC.
 1989 - The LSC entered into consulting agreement with the Southwest Conference, allowing the SWC to advise the LSC in eligibility cases, aid in arbitration of protests, and provide interpretations of NCAA rules, as well as administer the National Letter of Intent program. At the time, Shirley Morton of Angelo State University served as secretary/treasurer and Garner Roberts of Abilene Christian University served as news director of the LSC.
 1989 - West Texas State University dropped football and withdrew from the LSC, effective at the end of the 1989-90 academic year.
 1990 - On November 30, 1990, the LSC Council of Presidents requested an LSC expansion committee to be formed to contact institutions in Oklahoma and Arkansas regarding conference membership.
 1991 - On April 28, 1991, the LSC Directors of Athletics considered a new football schedule recommendation from football coaches for the 1992 season if a replacement for West Texas State was not found.
 1991 - On April 30, 1991, the LSC expansion committee was appointed to include Jerry Vandergriff of Angelo State, John "Skip" Wagnon of Central Oklahoma, Cecil Eager of Abilene Christian, and Dr. Margaret Harbison of East Texas State.
 1991 - On June 1, 1991, at the LSC Council of Presidents meeting, Angelo State president Dr. Drew Vincent said, "there is a survival issue in the conference that has nothing to do with finances which was that the conference needed to be enlarged. East Central University, Southwestern Oklahoma State University, and Northeastern State University might be interested in joining, as well as Tarleton State University and Midwestern State University.
 1991 - On November 25, 1991, the LSC Directors of Athletics requested Central Oklahoma's Skip Wagnon to invite representatives from Henderson State University, the University of Central Arkansas, Fort Hays State University, and Midwestern State University to a meeting on January 7, 1992, during the NCAA convention.
 1992 - On November 24, 1992, the LSC faculty athletics representatives voted unanimously to recommend the Council of Presidents that an invitation should be extended to West Texas State University (which had reinstated football), to rejoin the conference.
 1993 - On January 14, 1993, the LSC Council of Presidents voted unanimously to extend an invitation to West Texas State University, having the school to begin LSC competition for football in the 1996 fall season of the 1996-97 academic year, and to begin LSC competition for all other sports, effective in the 1994-95 academic year.
 1993 - On June 19, 1993, the LSC Council of Presidents accepted the withdraw of Cameron University from the LSC, effective in the 1993 fall season of the 1993-94 academic year, following Cameron's decision to discontinue football.
 1994 - On January 9, 1994, the LSC Council of Presidents voted unanimously to extend an invitation to Tarleton State University to join the LSC and compete in all sports except football for the 1994-95 academic year, if possible.
 1994 - On May 2, 1994, the LSC Faculty Athletics Representatives announced that the Southwest Conference could no longer provide services to the Lone Star Conference, and recommended a conference office be established and a commissioner be hired.
 1994 - On June 11, 1994, the Council of Presidents voted unanimously to establish an LSC office and to hire a commissioner.
 1994 - On September 5, 1994, Fred Jacoby was named the first full-time commissioner of the Lone Star Conference with the charge to expand the conference, to assist the new members in NAIA to NCAA transition, and to train a person for commissioner in establishing a conference office.
 1994 - On October 10, 1994, Ouachita Baptist University president Ben Elrod said that his university would join Harding University in applying for LSC membership.
 1995 - On January 5, 1995, on a conference call of the LSC Council of Presidents, Midwestern State University was admitted to the LSC in a unanimous vote of 8-0, effective September 1, 1995, therefore rejoining the conference. Only six members competed in football (Eastern New Mexico, Abilene Christian, Angelo State, Texas A&M–Commerce, Texas A&M–Kingsville, and Central Oklahoma).
 1995 - On January 8, 1995, at a joint meeting of the LSC Council of Presidents and the LSC Directors of Athletics at the NCAA convention in San Diego, a thorough discussion of conference expansion was held with the potential of developing two divisions of eight members each. The catalyst had been the fragmentation of NAIA Division I with member institutions moving to NCAA Division II. Discussion centered on universities in Oklahoma and Arkansas that had applied to NCAA Division II and the rationale for expansion. The consensus was that the LSC presidents should host a meeting of Oklahoma presidents to share information on expansion and to study the feasibility of developing a regional conference. A meeting would be set up in the next 60 days.
 1995 - On August 29, 1995, on a conference call of the executive committee of the LSC Council of Presidents, a recommendation was approved to "take a proactive position regarding expansion with the development of a regional conference with two divisions".
 1995 - On September 28, 1995, the executive committee of the LSC Council of Presidents met with the presidents of Northeastern State University, Southeastern Oklahoma State University, the University of Central Arkansas, Harding University, and Ouachita Baptist University. Focus of discussion was that with expansion, a strategic long-range decision would be made to stabilize LSC membership, while providing flexibility for conference athletics programs in scheduling, postseason playoff competition, gender-equity guidelines, marketing potential, media coverage, NCAA legislative strength, enhancing the image of the conference, and economy of scale for the conference administration and services. Further, the downside to the proposed expansion/realignment was minimal.
 1995 - On October 11, 1995, on a conference call of the LSC Council of Presidents, a recommendation was unanimously approved to extend invitations to Northeastern State University, Southeastern Oklahoma State University, the University of Central Arkansas, Harding University, and Ouachita Baptist University for LSC membership. On November 14, 1995, all institutions listed above (except Central Arkansas) accepted membership in the LSC, effective in the 1996-97 academic year.
 1996 - On March 6, 1996, Cameron University was readmitted to the LSC, after a two-year hiatus.
 1996 - Southwestern Oklahoma State University and East Central University were admitted to the LSC. With 17 members, the Lone Star Conference began competition with a north/south divisional alignment.
 2000 - Harding University and Ouachita Baptist University withdrew from the LSC to join the Gulf South Conference.
 2010 - The University of the Incarnate Word was admitted to the LSC.
 2011 - East Central University, Southeastern Oklahoma State University, and Southwestern Oklahoma State University left the LSC to join with a few Arkansas schools to form the Great American Conference; the University of Central Oklahoma and Northeastern State University left to join the Mid-America Intercollegiate Athletics Association.
 2013 - The University of the Incarnate Word and Abilene Christian University left the LSC to join the Southland Conference of NCAA Division I. Abilene Christian was formerly a member of that conference from 1963–64 to 1972–73. At the same time, men's soccer was dropped as a conference sport.
 2012 - Harding University returned to the conference as an affiliate member for track & field from the 2013 to the 2015 spring seasons.
 2013 - McMurry University returned to the conference as an affiliate member for track & field during the 2014 spring season, and for football only during the 2014 fall season.
 2016 - The University of Texas Permian Basin and Western New Mexico University were admitted to the LSC.
 2016 - Oklahoma Panhandle State University was admitted to the LSC as an affiliate member for football only during the 2016 fall season.
 2016 - Lubbock Christian University was admitted in the LSC as an affiliate member for track & field for the 2017 spring season.
 2018 - Dallas Baptist University was admitted in the LSC as an affiliate member for track & field for the 2019 spring season.
 2019 - Seven members of the Heartland Conference were admitted as full, non-football members to the LSC: Arkansas–Fort Smith, Dallas Baptist, Lubbock Christian, Oklahoma Christian, St. Edward's, St. Mary's (TX), and Texas A&M International. UAFS is now the LSC's first member in Arkansas since Harding and Ouachita Baptist departed in 2000. Additionally, UT Tyler joined the LSC as it began its transition from NCAA Division III. At the same time as the new members joined, men's soccer was reinstated as an LSC sport.
 Sept. 2019 - Tarleton announced it would move to the Division I Western Athletic Conference (WAC) effective in July 2020 for all sports except football, which initially played as an FCS independent. The WAC would eventually reinstate its football league at the FCS level in 2021 with Tarleton as a member.
 September 30, 2021 – The Southland Conference announced that Texas A&M–Commerce would start a transition to Division I in July 2022, joining the Southland at that time.
 November 18, 2021 – The LSC announced that the three remaining football members of the Great Northwest Athletic Conference—Central Washington, Simon Fraser, and Western Oregon—would become LSC football-only members effective in 2022.
 January 31, 2023 - Sul Ross State announces its intent to transition from NCAA Division III to Division II and rejoin the Lone Star Conference after 48 years as its 18th member in 2024.

Member schools

Current members
The LSC currently has 17 full members, all but five are public schools:

Notes

Future members

Affiliate members
The LSC currently has three affiliate members, all are public schools, as they joined as football-only members in July 2022.

Former members
The LSC had 20 former full members, with a solid majority (13) being public schools.

Notes

Former affiliate members
The LSC had one former affiliate member, also a public school:

Notes

Membership timeline

Sponsored sports

Men's sponsored sports by school

Women's sponsored sports by school

Other sponsored sports by school

Notes

In addition to the above:

 Arkansas–Fort Smith counts its male and female cheerleaders, plus its all-female dance team (called a "pom squad" on the school's athletic website), as varsity athletes.
 Cameron counts its female cheerleaders (though not male cheerleaders) and all-female dance team as varsity athletes under the collective name of "spirit team".
 Dallas Baptist fields a varsity team in the all-female cheerleading discipline of STUNT.
 Eastern New Mexico counts its female cheerleaders (though not male cheerleaders) and all-female dance team as varsity athletes under the collective name of "spirit squad". The school also fields a coeducational rodeo team.
 Lubbock Christian counts its female cheerleaders (though not male cheerleaders) as varsity athletes.
 Oklahoma Christian fields a varsity team in the non-NCAA sport of men's bowling.
 St. Edward's counts its male and female cheerleaders as varsity athletes.
 UT Tyler counts its cheerleaders (male and female) and dance team (all-female) as varsity athletes under the collective name of "spirit squad".

Only schools that explicitly list cheerleading and dance teams as men's, women's, or coed sports are counted in this listing. Some schools feature links to said teams on their athletics websites, but place them in a specific menu for "spirit teams" or a similar term.

Facilities

Champions
This is a list of conference champions since 1997.

Men

Note: (HC) denotes the Heartland Conference. In 2012-2013, the LSC stopped sponsoring Men's soccer. In 2016, 4 schools (Eastern New Mexico, Midwestern State, UT-Permian Basin, and West Texas A&M) joined the Heartland as affiliate members for Men's soccer. When the Heartland folded, most schools became non-football members of the LSC.

Women

Conference tournament champions

Division championships
From 1997-2011, and 2020-present, the LSC has been divided into divisions. From 1997-2011, the split was north-south. Beginning in the 2019-2020 academic year, the LSC was split into three nameless divisions among the non-football sports: West Texas and New Mexico in the western division; South Texas, Central Texas, and DFW in the central division; East Texas, North Texas, Oklahoma, and Arkansas in the eastern division. The divisional split wasn't carried over into the 2021-2022 season.

2014-2015
In the 2014 season, a conference playoff was added due to the small number of football programs in the conference. At the end of the season, the teams were guaranteed two more conference games in the Lone Star Conference playoffs, the teams were split into two separate brackets, the championship bracket (seeds 1-4) and the non-championship bracket (seeds 5-7). This format ended after the 2015 season due to the addition of Western New Mexico, UT Permian Basin, and Oklahoma Panhandle State.

Notable athletes

Abilene Christian University

 James Browne, Olympic long jumper from Antigua
 Danieal Manning, NFL safety and kickoff returner
 Bobby Morrow, sprinter, won gold medals in the 100 meters, 200, and 4 × 100 meters relay at the 1956 Summer Olympics
 Wilbert Montgomery, former NFL running back and current running backs coach of the Baltimore Ravens
 Billy Olson, pole vaulter, set 11 indoor world records in the 1980s and was the first to clear 19 feet indoors
 John "Bradshaw" Layfield, two time All-Lone Star Conference lineman & member of the WWE Hall of Fame
 Ove Johansson, Swedish-born NFL placekicker, world-record holder for the longest field goal in organized football (69 yards)
 Bernard Scott, NFL running back for the Cincinnati Bengals
 Johnny Knox, NFL wide receiver for the Chicago Bears
 Earl Young, sprinter, won gold medal in the 4 × 400 meters relay at the 1960 Summer Olympics

Angelo State University

 Alvin Garrett, former NFL wide receiver
 Tranel Hawkins, hurdler, placed 6th in the 400 meters hurdles at the 1984 Summer Olympics
 Pierce Holt, former Pro Bowl NFL defensive end
 Jim Morris, former relief pitcher for the Tampa Bay Devil Rays, inspiration for the film The Rookie
 Grant Teaff, College Football Hall of Fame coach, coached 21 seasons at Baylor
 Clayton Weishuhn, former NFL linebacker
 Charlie West, former NFL safety

Cameron University

 Jason Christiansen, former Major League Baseball pitcher
 John Brandes, former NFL tight end and long snapper
 Mark Cotney, former NFL safety
 Avery Johnson, former NBA point guard and former Brooklyn Nets head coach

University of Central Oklahoma

 Keith Traylor, former NFL nose tackle

Eastern New Mexico University

 Mike Sinclair, former Pro Bowl NFL defensive end, current Chicago Bears defensive line coach

Midwestern State University

 Marqui Christian, current NFL strong safety for the Los Angeles Rams.
 Dominic Rhodes, former NFL running back, later running back for the Virginia Destroyers of the United Football League
 Amini Silatolu, NFL guard for the Carolina Panthers
 Bryan Gilmore, former NFL wide receiver
 Will Pettis, former Arena Football League wide receiver and defensive back, two-time AFL Ironman of the Year
 Daniel Woolard, Major League Soccer defender for D.C. United

Tarleton State University

 Richard Bartel, NFL quarterback for the Arizona Cardinals
 James Dearth, former NFL long snapper and tight end
 Brandon Lee, American Basketball Association point guard/shooting guard for the North Dallas Vandals
 Derrick Ross, former NFL running back, later Arena Football League running back for the Philadelphia Soul

Texas A&M University–Commerce

 Wade Wilson, former NFL quarterback and current NFL quarterbacks coach for the Dallas Cowboys
 Harvey Martin, former All-Pro NFL defensive end and member of the NFL 1970s All-Decade Team
 Dwight White, former Pro Bowl NFL defensive end and member of the Pittsburgh Steelers' Steel Curtain defensive line
 Kevin Mathis, former NFL cornerback
 Derrick Crawford, former Arena Football League defensive lineman
 Allen Roulette, NFL- Buffalo Bills and AFL- Albany Firebirds, New Orleans Knights, Dallas Texas, Tampa Bay Storm
 Luis Perez, 2017 Harlon Hill Trophy winner and current quarterback for the New York Guardians. Previously also signed with the Birmingham Iron, Philadelphia Eagles, Detroit Lions and Los Angeles Rams
 Will Cureton, starting quarterback for the 1972 NAIA National Championship-winning Lions. Played for two seasons for the Cleveland Browns
 John Carlos, Olympic Medalist. Famed for raising his fist in protest during the medal ceremony following the Men's 200m run in the 1968 Summer Olympics
 Clint Dolezel, former Arena Football player for the Milwaukee Mustangs (1994–2001), Houston Thunderbears, Grand Rapids Rampage, Las Vegas Gladiators and Dallas Desperados. Won 3 Arena Bowl Championships combined as a player and later coach.

Texas A&M University–Kingsville

 Roberto Garza, NFL center/guard for the Chicago Bears
 Darrell Green, former Hall of Fame NFL cornerback who played a record 20 seasons with the Washington Redskins
 Al Harris, former All-Pro NFL cornerback
 Jermaine Mayberry, former NFL offensive tackle/guard
 Gene Upshaw, former Hall of Fame NFL guard and longtime executive director of the NFLPA
 Dwayne Nix, football tight end, member of the College Football Hall of Fame

Texas Woman's University

 Louise Ritter high jumper, won gold medal in the high jump at the 1988 Summer Olympics

West Texas A&M University

 John Ayers, former NFL All-Pro offensive lineman, two Super Bowl rings
 Carl Birdsong, former NFL Pro Bowl punter
 Tully Blanchard, former professional wrestler and current wrestling manager; inducted into the WWE Hall of Fame as a member of the Four Horsemen stable
 Maurice Cheeks, former NBA All-Star point guard, 1 NBA Championship, former 76ers head coach, current Oklahoma City Thunder assistant coach
 Ted DiBiase (Sr.), former professional wrestler and member of the WWE Hall of Fame
 Manny Fernandez, professional wrestler in numerous independent promotions
 Dory Funk Jr., former professional wrestler and current wrestling trainer, also a WWE Hall of Fame member
 Terry Funk, brother of Dory; semiretired professional wrestler, famous as a pioneer of hardcore wrestling and also a WWE Hall of Fame member
 Brittan Golden, NFL receiver
 Frank Goodish, better known as Bruiser Brody, late professional wrestler and one of the industry's most famous brawlers
 Stan Hansen, former professional wrestler most famous for his career in All Japan Pro Wrestling, also a WWE Hall of Fame member
 Alondra Johnson, former All-Star CFL linebacker and member of the Canadian Football Hall of Fame
 Steve Kragthorpe, former quarterback and college football head coach, current quarterbacks coach for LSU
 Kareem Larrimore, former NFL and Arena Football League defensive back
 Jerry Logan, former Pro Bowl NFL safety, one Super Bowl ring
 Reggie McElroy, former NFL offensive lineman. 
 Mercury Morris, former All-Pro NFL running back, 3X Pro Bowlwe, 2 Super Bowl rings
 Keith Null, free agent NFL quarterback
 Khiry Robinson, NFL running back for the New Orleans Saints
 Virgil Runnels, better known as Dusty Rhodes, late professional wrestler and member of the WWE Hall of Fame
 Merced Solis, semi-retired professional wrestler best known as Tito Santana and member of the WWE Hall of Fame
 Duane Thomas, former NFL running one Super Bowl ring
 Chaun Thompson, former NFL linebacker
 Barry Windham, semiretired professional wrestler and member of the WWE Hall of Fame as a part of the Four Horsemen

References

External links
 

 
Sports organizations established in 1931
Articles which contain graphical timelines